Angie Buhl O'Donnell is an American politician from Sioux Falls, South Dakota who serves in the South Dakota Senate. She has represented the 15th district in Minnehaha County as a Democrat since January 2011.

A fourth generation South Dakotan, Buhl was born in Aberdeen and raised in Yankton. An adoptee, her parents were small business owners. She graduated from the University of South Dakota in 2007 with a degree in psychology and music.

In 2010, Buhl O'Donnell ran against incumbent state senator Kathy Miles, a fellow Democrat. In the primary election held on June 8, 2010, Buhl O'Donnell received 398 votes while Miles earned only 276. Buhl was therefore nominated and, since no Republicans or independents had filed, she won the general election unopposed. She took office in January 2011. Buhl was re-elected in 2012 for a second term.

Buhl O'Donnell is openly bisexual and was the first LGBT member of the South Dakota Legislature. Her 2012 re-election campaign won the support of the Gay & Lesbian Victory Fund.

References

External links
Legislative homepage
Campaign website

Living people
Politicians from Aberdeen, South Dakota
Politicians from Sioux Falls, South Dakota
Democratic Party South Dakota state senators
Bisexual politicians
LGBT state legislators in South Dakota
LGBT people from South Dakota
University of South Dakota alumni
American adoptees
1985 births
Women state legislators in South Dakota
Bisexual women
21st-century American politicians
21st-century American women politicians
21st-century LGBT people